Engirundho Vandhan is a 1995 Indian Tamil-language comedy film directed by Santhana Bharathi. The film stars Sathyaraj, Roja and Aamani, with Vijayakumar, Janagaraj, Kalyan Kumar, Vinu Chakravarthy, R. Sundarrajan, Bhanu Chander and Thyagu playing supporting roles. It was released on 15 January 1995. The composer duo Viswanathan–Ramamoorthy collaborated after a 30-year hiatus and it eventually became their last collaboration. The film was a remake of the Malayalam film Chithram (1988).

Plot
Radha (Roja) is the daughter of the wealthy NRI Viswanathan (Kalyan Kumar) who resides in the United States. Radha brought up in Chennai by her father's friend Manikandan (Janagaraj). Radha is in love with another man Gautham (Bhanu Chander). Her father finds a groom in the US for her and wants his daughter to marry him, but Radha decides to marry her lover Gautham against the wishes of her father. Manikandan supports her will and helps them to get married. When her boyfriend finds out that she will be disinherited, he ditches her at the marriage registrar office.

Shortly after her father decides to retract his disapproval and to spend a fortnight's vacation with his daughter and his new son-in-law in his estate near a tribal community where Sundaram (R. Sundarrajan) is the chief. Because her father is already ill and because this may be his last vacation, Radha and Manikandan want to make it as happy for him as possible. They decide to conceal the fact that her boyfriend dumped her.

Manikandan hires the small-time crook Kannan (Sathyaraj) to play the part of the husband for a fortnight. What transpires next forms the rest of the story.

Cast

Sathyaraj as Kannan
Roja as Radha
Aamani as Janaki
Vijayakumar as Police Commissioner
Janagaraj as Manikandan
Kalyan Kumar as Viswanathan
Vinu Chakravarthy as Tribal Chief
R. Sundarrajan as Sundaram
Bhanu Chander as Gautham
Thyagu as Sundaram's son
R. S. Shivaji
Kambar Jayaraman as Pandian, Janaki's father
Kavithalaya Krishnan as Shiva
S. V. Shanmugam
Mohan Raman
Bharani as Sundaram's daughter
C. R. Saraswathi as Meenakshi, Sundaram's wife
Ponvannan in a guest appearance

Soundtrack

The film score and the soundtrack were composed by the duo Viswanathan–Ramamoorthy. They collaborated after 30 years (last being Aayirathil Oruvan in 1965) and it eventually became their last collaboration. The soundtrack, released in 1995, features 6 tracks with lyrics written by Vaali.

Release
T. K. Balaji of indolink.com said, "Crazy Mohan's dialogue barely pass muster as does Santhaana Bharathi's direction. Satyaraj looks out of place in this movie. Roja comes out good, but Janakaraj and R.Sunderrajan manage to irritate you out of your senses. The less said about the music, the better". Thulasi of Kalki praised the film for having a natural, poignant ending and also noted the elegance with which the foundation was built from the beginning to the last-minute tragedy was awe-inspiring but felt there should have been more depth with the way flashback was setup and called few songs as speed breakers. He however concluded that director Santhana Bharathi has broken the argument of succeeding only with Kamal Haasan and called it a complete film. The film flopped at the box office.

References

1995 films
1990s Tamil-language films
Indian comedy films
Tamil remakes of Malayalam films
Films scored by Viswanathan–Ramamoorthy
Films with screenplays by Crazy Mohan
Films directed by Santhana Bharathi
1995 comedy films